Eino Kalpala (5 August 1926 – 12 August 2022) was a Finnish alpine skier who competed in the 1952 Winter Olympics. Kalpala has also been a world champion veteran alpine skier. Eino Kalpala also participated in the rally of a thousand lakes with his brother Osmo Kalpal. He turned 90 in August 2016. Kalpala died in Espoo on 12 August 2022, at the age of 96.

References

External links

1926 births
2022 deaths
Alpine skiers at the 1952 Winter Olympics
Finnish male alpine skiers
Olympic alpine skiers of Finland
20th-century Finnish people